Carlos Henrique Hernández (born April 22, 1980) is a Venezuelan former professional baseball starting pitcher. He played for the Houston Astros of Major League Baseball (MLB) from 2001 to 2002 and 2004.

Career
In 2001, he suffered a partial tear of his left rotator cuff diving back to second base. Before the injury, he was 1–0 with a 1.02 ERA, allowing only 11 hits in 17.6 innings. Despite pitching in pain, Hernández again showed promise in 2002, but his season was hampered by an ongoing injury with his left shoulder. He finished 7–5 with a 4.38 ERA in 21 starts, but twice was disabled. He missed the 2003 season following surgery. In 2004, Hernández started his rehabilitation with the New Orleans Zephyrs, the Triple-A affiliate of the Astros, and finished with the big club with a 1–3 mark and a 6.43 ERA in nine starts.

After not playing baseball for anybody in 2007, Hernández signed with the Tampa Bay Rays in 2008 and was assigned to their Single-A affiliate, the Vero Beach Devil Rays, where in six starts, he went 2–1 with a 1.04 ERA.

In a three-year career, Hernández posted a 9–8 record with 136 strikeouts and a 4.54 ERA in 172.2 innings.

Pitching style
Hernández has a low 90s fastball, a very good curveball, a changeup, and he can throw a decent slider as well.
He is a switch hitter and throws left-handed.

See also
 List of Major League Baseball players from Venezuela

External links
ESPN, or Retrosheet, or Pura Pelota (Venezuelan Winter League)

1980 births
Living people
Corpus Christi Hooks players
Diablos Rojos del México players
Durham Bulls players
Houston Astros players
Major League Baseball pitchers
Major League Baseball players from Venezuela
Martinsville Astros players
Mexican League baseball pitchers
Michigan Battle Cats players
Navegantes del Magallanes players
New Orleans Zephyrs players
People from Carabobo
Round Rock Express players
Venezuelan expatriate baseball players in Mexico
Venezuelan expatriate baseball players in the United States
Vero Beach Devil Rays players
World Baseball Classic players of Venezuela
2006 World Baseball Classic players